Centerton is an unincorporated town in Clay Township, Morgan County, in the U.S. state of Indiana.

History
Centerton was laid out in 1854. A post office was established at Centerton in 1854, and remained in operation until it was discontinued in 1893.

Education
Grade school students attend Centerton Elementary School, a part of the school district of Martinsville. Students from Centerton attend Martinsville East Middle School and Martinsville High School in Martinsville, Indiana.

Geography

Notable people
Centerton was the childhood home of basketball coach John Wooden, whose family farm sits on the edge of town (with historical marker), and where the Johnny Wooden Interurban parkway runs.

References

Unincorporated communities in Morgan County, Indiana
Unincorporated communities in Indiana
Indianapolis metropolitan area